Night Duty is a 1974 Indian Malayalam-language film, directed by J. Sasikumar and produced by Thiruppathi Chettiyar. The film stars Prem Nazir, Jayabharathi, Kaviyoor Ponnamma and Adoor Bhasi in the lead roles. The film has musical score by V. Dakshinamoorthy.

Cast
Prem Nazir as Radhakrishnan
Jayabharathi as Vimala
Kaviyoor Ponnamma as Savithriyamma
Adoor Bhasi as Padmanabha Panikker
Sankaradi as Kuttan pilla
Sreelatha Namboothiri as Rajamma 
T. R. Omana as Devakiyamma
T. S. Muthaiah as Warrier
Bahadoor as Krishnankutty
Meena as Kamalamma
Sobha as Ammini
Muthukulam Raghavan Pillai as Ponnuvelan

Soundtrack
The music was composed by V. Dakshinamoorthy and the lyrics were written by Vayalar Ramavarma.

References

External links
 

1974 films
1970s Malayalam-language films
Films directed by J. Sasikumar